The Argentina national rugby sevens team competes in the World Rugby Sevens Series, in the Rugby World Cup Sevens, and, beginning in 2016, in the Summer Olympics.

The Argentine rugby sevens team has had some success in the World Rugby Sevens Series, finishing third in 2003-04, and finishing among the top six teams in five out of six seasons from 2003-04 to 2008-09. Argentina won the USA Sevens tournament in 2004 and again in 2009. During its peak, the Argentine team was led by Santiago Gómez Cora, who is ranked all-time first in tries (230), fifth in points (1,178), and third in appearances (61).

Argentina's best finish at the Rugby World Cup Sevens came in 2009, when the team reached the finals and finished as runners up.

Tournament history
 * asterisk indicates a shared placing

Summer Olympic Games

Rugby World Cup Sevens

Pan American Games

World Games

Rugby X Tournament

World Rugby Sevens Series

Argentina is a "core team" on the World Rugby Sevens Series. Their best season was the 2003–04 World Sevens Series, when they finished third.

2010s

Team

Current squad

Player records
The following shows leading career Argentina players based on performance in the World Rugby Sevens Series. Players in bold are still active.

Previous squads
 2017–18 World Rugby Sevens Series

Tournament wins

See also
 Argentina national rugby union team
 Rugby union in Argentina

Notes
 Rugby sevens was discontinued at the World Games after 2013 due to the sport returning to the Olympics in 2016.

References

External links
 
WorldRugby profile

National rugby sevens teams
Sev